Kondakameru Wildlife Sanctuary is a wildlife sanctuary in Malkangiri district, Odisha, India.

It covers an area of 430 km², mostly small hills and valleys. It is in the Eastern Highlands moist deciduous forests ecoregion. The major plant communities are mixed deciduous forests and scrublands.

References

Eastern Highlands moist deciduous forests
Wildlife sanctuaries in Odisha
Malkangiri district
Protected areas with year of establishment missing